Eoophyla abstrusa is a moth in the family Crambidae. It was described by Hou-Hun Li, Ping You and Shu-Xia Wang in 2003. It is found in China (Guizhou).

References

Eoophyla
Moths described in 2003